Alok is an Indian given name of Sanskrit origin.

People with the given name Alok
Alok (DJ) (born 1991), Brazilian DJ and music producer
Alok Bhargava (born 1954), Indian-American econometrician
Alok R. Chaturvedi, Professor of Information Systems 
Alok Dixit, journalist and social activist
Alok Jena (born 1948), Indian cricketer
Alok Kapali (born 1984), Bangladeshi cricketer
Alok Mehta, Indian Hindi journalist, editor-in-chief of National Dunia
Alok Kumar Mehta (born 1966), Indian politician, member of the 14th Lok Sabha of India
Alok Mukherjee (born c. 1945), Canadian human rights and equity facilitator 
Alok Nath (born 1956), Indian film actor
Alok Nembang, Nepali singer and director
Alok Sharma (born 1967), Indian-born British politician
Alok Tiwari (born 1979), Indian politician
Alok Vaid-Menon (born 1991), Indian-American artist and activist.

See also
Alok Industries, a textile manufacturing company based in Mumbai, India
Alok Senior Secondary School - see List of schools in Udaipur, Rajasthan, India